Europlema is a genus of moths in the family Uraniidae. The genus was erected by Jeremy Daniel Holloway in 1998.

Species
Europlema bilobuncus Holloway, 1998
Europlema conchiferata (Moore, 1887)
Europlema desistaria (Walker, 1861)
Europlema instabilata (Walker, 1866)
Europlema irrorata (Moore, 1887)
Europlema melanosticta (de Joannis, 1915)
Europlema nigropustulata (Warren, 1905)
Europlema nivosaria (Walker, 1866)
Europlema poecilaria (Swinhoe, 1905)
Europlema quadripunctata (Wileman, 1916)
Europlema semibrunnea (Pagenstecher, 1884)
Europlema vacuata (Warren, 1905)

References

Uraniidae